Ana Cristina de Oliveira (born 24 July 1973) is a Portuguese model and actress.

Early life and career
Oliveira was born in Lisbon, Portugal. Her father worked in the Portuguese radio industry while her mother worked in a Lisbon movie theater. An only child, she originally wanted to become a journalist. She eventually moved to the US on 25 July 2003, though she still holds a Portuguese passport.

In 1996, Oliveira was featured on Bryan Adams' music video "The Only Thing That Looks Good On Me Is You".  In 1999, she starred in the music video for Chris Cornell's single "Can't Change Me".

In 2006 she won the Prix d'interpretation Janine Bazin (Best Actress) at the Entrevues Belfort film festival for her portrayal of the title role in the feature film Odete (also known as Two Drifters). She is internationally known for playing roles in US films Taxi, Miami Vice, television (CSI: Miami), and advertising for Levi's in 1996.

Awards and nominations

References

External links
 
 
 

1973 births
Living people
Actresses from Lisbon
Portuguese female models
Portuguese film actresses
Portuguese emigrants to the United States
21st-century Portuguese actresses